Jon Phipps McCalla (born 1947) is a senior United States district judge of the United States District Court for the Western District of Tennessee.

Education and career

Born in Memphis, Tennessee, McCalla received a Bachelor of Science degree from the University of Tennessee in 1969 and was in the United States Army from 1969 to 1971, achieving the rank of Lieutenant. He received a Juris Doctor from Vanderbilt University Law School in 1974. He was a law clerk to Judge Bailey Brown of the United States District Court for the Western District of Tennessee from 1974 to 1975. He was in private practice in Memphis from 1975 to 1992.

Federal judicial service

On August 1, 1991, McCalla was nominated by President George H. W. Bush to a new seat on the United States District Court for the Western District of Tennessee created by 104 Stat. 5089. He was confirmed by the United States Senate on February 6, 1992, and received his commission on February 10, 1992. He was Chief Judge from 2008 to 2013, managing the third-busiest federal judicial district in the United States. McCalla remains an active senior judge. In April 2018 McCalla decided a case involving an important constitutional challenge to Tennessee's controversial billboard law. He took senior status on August 23, 2013.

Reprimand

In 2000, several attorneys who practiced before Judge McCalla and in his courtroom filed complaints against him alleging misconduct. Specifically, the lawyers accused McCalla of being verbally abusive. McCalla admitted the allegations. He agreed to a formal reprimand which was imposed by the Sixth Circuit Judicial Council in 2001. McCalla was only one of seven federal judges to be formally disciplined in the 2000s. Despite this incident, McCalla's colleagues subsequently elevated him to the role of Chief Judge where his work helped to make the United States District Court for the Western District of Tennessee one of the more efficient federal courthouses in the country, according to various statistical measurements including time to trial (one of the lowest) and trials completed (the second highest).

References

Sources

1947 births
Living people
Judges of the United States District Court for the Western District of Tennessee
People from Memphis, Tennessee
United States district court judges appointed by George H. W. Bush
20th-century American judges
United States Army officers
University of Memphis alumni
Vanderbilt University Law School alumni
21st-century American judges